Domenic J. Sarno (born May 4, 1963) is the current mayor of Springfield, Massachusetts. First elected in 2007, Sarno has won re-election five times since and is a member of the Democratic Party. Winning election to a fifth term overall in 2019 and the third four-year term, he is the longest-serving mayor in Springfield's history.

Early life 
Sarno was born in Springfield, Massachusetts to Alfonso and Clara Sarno, who were Italian immigrants and small business owners. He graduated from the High School of Commerce. He studied political science at American International College for some time, but ultimately graduated from Westfield State University with a degree in psychology. He is a practicing Roman Catholic.

Sarno worked as an aide to Springfield Mayor Mary Hurley from 1989 to 1991. From 1996 to 2002 he was an aide to Hampden County District Attorney William Bennett. Sarno later worked as executive director of the South End Community Center from 2002 to 2007. During this time, he also served as an at-large member of the Springfield City Council. Sarno was first elected to the city council in 1999, and he was subsequently elected to three more two-year terms.

Mayoralty

Elections 
In 2007, Sarno announced that he would challenge incumbent Mayor Charles Ryan, who was serving his fifth non-consecutive term in office. During the campaign, Sarno focused on Springfield's trash collection fee, while Ryan argued that he had helped to prevent the city from falling into bankruptcy. On November 6, 2007, Sarno won 53% of the vote to Ryan's 47%.

Sarno ran for reelection in 2009, facing City Councilor Bud Williams. Sarno received 69% of the vote to Williams’ 29%. In that same year, Springfield voters approved a change to the city's charter, which extended the mayor's term in office to four years. This provision did not, however, take effect until the 2011 municipal elections.

In 2011, Sarno won reelection to a four-year term. He defeated City Councilor Jose Tosado by winning 71% of the vote. While Tosado won several key labor union endorsements during the campaign, Sarno touted his fiscal management and response to the 2011 New England tornado outbreak.

In 2015 Sarno was reelected, defeating local business owner Salvatore Circosta with 77% of the vote, with Circosta winning 22.5%.

In 2019, Sarno won reelection, defeating challenger and local activist Yolanda Cancel with 77% of the vote to Cancel's 23%. With the expansion of terms to 4 years after 2011, following the 2019 election, Sarno became the longest-serving mayor in the city's history, a record preceded by Daniel B. Brunton in 1957.

Tenure 

When Sarno took office in 2007, Springfield was in the midst of a financial crisis. The city suffered from a shrinking industrial tax base, rising budget deficits, and the fact it had been downgraded to junk bond status by credit rating agencies. In 2004, the Massachusetts General Court and Governor Mitt Romney responded to this financial crisis by giving the city a no-interest $52 million loan. In return, a state-run Finance Control Board took authority over almost all municipal functions. During Sarno's first term in office, the city's financial standing improved, with Moody's Investors Service upgrading its bond rating. In January 2009, Governor Deval Patrick signed legislation disbanding the Finance Control Board and giving Springfield ten additional years to repay the loan.

Prior to elimination of the Finance Control Board, the body occasionally clashed with Sarno. Significantly, in 2007 the board voted in favor of conducting a full search for a new police commissioner after Edward A. Flynn left to become Chief of the Milwaukee Police Department. Sarno favored immediately appointing Springfield's Deputy Chief William Fitchet, who eventually won the position.

One of the most important moments of Sarno's second term came on June 1, 2011, when Springfield was struck by the 2011 New England tornado outbreak, which left three hundred people injured in the city and a significant amount of damage on Main Street. 500 people were left homeless and in temporary shelter in the MassMutual Center.

After Massachusetts passed an expanded gambling law in 2011, several casino companies began competing for the single casino license available for Western Massachusetts. Sarno's administration set a January 2013 deadline for companies to submit plans to the city. MGM Resorts International and Penn National Gaming met this deadline. In May 2013, Sarno selected MGM as the city's sole competitor for the Western Massachusetts casino license. As part of a host agreement, MGM pledged to pay the city $25 million per year in return for permission to build an $800 million resort in the city's South End.

Electoral history

City Council

Mayor

References 

1963 births
20th-century American politicians
21st-century American politicians
American people of Italian descent
American Roman Catholics
Catholics from Massachusetts
Living people
Massachusetts Democrats
Mayors of Springfield, Massachusetts
Springfield, Massachusetts City Council members
Westfield State University alumni
American International College alumni